747 Winchester is an asteroid, a minor planet orbiting the Sun. It was discovered in 1913, and is named after the town in which it was discovered, Winchester, Massachusetts, in the USA.

Photometric observations of this asteroid at the Palmer Divide Observatory in Colorado Springs, Colorado in 2007 gave a light curve with a period of 9.4146 ± 0.0002 hours and a brightness variation of 0.16 ± 0.02 in magnitude. This is reasonably consistent with independent results reported in 1983 (9.40h), 1993 (9.402h), and 2007 (9.334h).

References

External links 
 Lightcurve plot of 747 Winchester, Palmer Divide Observatory, B. D. Warner (2007)
 Asteroid Lightcurve Database (LCDB), query form (info )
 Dictionary of Minor Planet Names, Google books
 Asteroids and comets rotation curves, CdR – Observatoire de Genève, Raoul Behrend
 Discovery Circumstances: Numbered Minor Planets (1)-(5000) – Minor Planet Center
 
 

Background asteroids
Winchester
Winchester
PC-type asteroids (Tholen)
C-type asteroids (SMASS)
19130307